Sampson may refer to:

Military
 , several Royal Navy ships
 , several US Navy ships
 Sampson-class destroyer, a World War I US Navy class
 Sampson Air Force Base, near Seneca Lake, New York, closed in 1956
 SAMPSON, a multi-function radar system for warships
 Sampson Medal, a military decoration of the United States Navy

Places

Australia
 Sampson Flat, South Australia, a locality
 Sampson Inlet, Western Australia, part of Camden Sound

United States

 Sampson City, Florida, an unincorporated community
 Sampson's Island (Massachusetts), an uninhabited barrier island
 Sampsons Pond, Carver, Massachusetts
 Sampson, Missouri, an unincorporated community
 Sampson State Park, Seneca County, New York, at one time Sampson Air Force Base
 Sampson County, North Carolina
 Sampson, Wisconsin, a town 
 Sampson, Oconto County, Wisconsin, an unincorporated community

Other places
 Saint Sampson, Guernsey, a parish of Guernsey, Channel Islands
 St Sampson, Cornwall, a civil parish in England
 Sampson (crater)

People
 Sampson the Hospitable (6th century), venerated as a saint in the Eastern Orthodox and Catholic Churches
 Sampson (surname), a list of people and fictional characters
 Sampson (given name), a list of historical and Biblical figures and fictional characters

Other uses
 Sampson (automobile), American automobile manufactured in 1904
 Sampson (horse), a shire horse that is the tallest horse on record
 Sampson, an American merchant ship involved in the 1793 Sampson Incident
 Locomotive Sampson, built 1855, one of the four South Devon Railway Tornado class steam locomotives
 SS Admiral Sampson, an American-flagged cargo and passenger steamship, 1898–1914
 St Sampson's Church, Golant, Cornwall, England

See also
 Saint-Samson (disambiguation)
 Samson (disambiguation)
 Simpson (disambiguation)